Bajitpur is an upazila of Kishoreganj District in Bangladesh. Bajitpur was created by Baizid Kha. Formerly Bhairab and Kuliarchar were included in this town. This place is full of canals and rivers.Dilalpur river port here was famous in the subcontinent during the British period.

It was previously a part of greater Mymensingh district. It has one of the best medical college named Jahurul Islam Medical College in Bangladesh.

It has an airport named Bajitpur Airport, which is currently unused and closed.

History

During the British period the naval port of Dilalpur of this upazila became famous. Indigo centres were established at Gopinathpur and Ghoraghat. Consignments of pearl of the Bhati region were made from these areas.

Bajitpur was created by Baizid Kha. The Fakir-Sanyasi revolts extensively spread over Bajitpur.
	
During the war of liberation the Muktibahinis liberated Bajitpur on 26 October after defeating occupant Pak army. Seven freedom fighters were killed in encounters with the Pakistan army. The Pakistani army killed about 400 innocent people and 60 women lost their sanctity.

Fine quality muslin

Bajitpur was known for the production of fine quality muslin, called tanjab. The art of making Jamdani designs on fine fabric reached its zenith during Mughal rule. There were handlooms in almost all villages of dhaka district. Bajitpur among Dhaka, Sonargaon, Dhamrai, Titabari and Jangalbari were famous for making superior quality Jamdani and muslin. Traders from Europe, Iran, Armenia, as well as Mughal-Pathan traders used to deal in these fabrics. The Mughal Emperor, the Nawab of Bengal and other aristocrats used to engage agents at Dhaka to buy high quality muslin and Jamdani from the above-mentioned selected places for their masters use.

After the liberation of Bangladesh, a Jamdani village was established at Demra near Dhaka to provide financial support to weavers. Jamdani weavers of other areas, however, suffer from lack of patronage and support of their labour and expertise. The silent looms of village Madhurapur in bajitpur upazila of kishoreganj district speak volumes about the decline of this industry. This village was once famous for producing Jamdani cloth and fancy textiles with yarn of 100/300 counts.

Geography

It has 35,051 households and total area 193.76 km2.

Rivers
There are many main rivers in Bajitpur.

Meghna
Brahmaputra
Ghorautra
Dholeshori

Economy

Main occupations

Agriculture 42.29%
Fishing 2.67%
Agricultural Labourer 18.97%
Wage Labourer 4.13%
Commerce 12.28%
Transport 3.12% 
Service 5.22%
Others 11.32%

Land use

Total cultivable land 15,862 hectares; single crop 31.90%, double crop 56.61%, treble crop 11.48%; 
	
Land under irrigation: 12,800 hectares.
	
Land control: among the peasants 55% are landless, 31% small, 12% intermediate, 2% rich.
	
Value of land: the market value of the land of the first grade is about 8500 Taka per 0.01 hectare.

Main crops

Paddy, jute, wheat, potato, peanut, sweet potato and vegetables.

Main fruits

Mango, Jackfruit, banana, bel, lemon, natkol, lotkon (bobi)

Manufactories

Rice Mill 15
Saw Mill 10
Iron Boar Factory 2
Ice Mill 3
Welding 5

Cottage industries

Chappa dry fish 100, Wood Works 80, Goldsmith 32, Blacksmith 25, Potteries 9, Tailoring 112, Wooden Boat making 7

Hats, bazars and fairs

Total number of hats and bazars are 21,

the most noted are 
 Fatehpur
 Sreedharganj
 Bajitpur
 Gazirchar
 Dilalpur/Burhanpur
 Bhagolpur
 Shorarchar
 Hilachia Bazar
 Pirijpur
 Halimpur Bazar
 Indurdyr Dorga Bazer
 Shitoli mela Aliabad
 
fair 6
 Bhagolpur fair
 Kamiarbali fair
 Kamalpur fair
 Gazirchar fair
 Dilalpur fair
 Fulbaria fair 
 Boishakhi fair (Bashmohol)
 Kurer phuller mella (fair). North Shekhdi, Halimpur. Horse race is the main attraction of the fair. The fair is usually held in mid-January.

Main exports

Rice, Egg, Milk, Banana, Chicken. Fish

Administration

Bajitpur thana was established in 1835 and was turned into a municipal town on 1 April 1869. Bajitpur was turned into an upazila in 1983.
	
Bajitpur (Town) The town is now a municipality with an area of 9.84 km2 and population 26609; male 50.76%, female 49.24%; density of population is 2704 per km2. The literacy rate is 41.4%.

Bajitpur Upazila is divided into Bajitpur Municipality and 11 union parishads: Baliardi, Dighirpar, Dilalpur, Gazirchar, Halimpur, Hilochia, Humaipur, Kailag, Maijchar, Pirijpur, and Sararchar. The union parishads are subdivided into 84 mauzas and 188 villages.

Bajitpur Municipality is subdivided into 9 wards and 28 mahallas.

Transport

Roads: pucca 70 km, mud road 287
Railways: 10 km 
Waterways: 40 km

Traditional transport Palanquin, bullock cart, horse carriage, buffalo cart, pansi boat, saranga boat. These means of transport are either extinct or nearly extinct.

Education
Literacy rate 75%.

College 4, 
Private Medical College 1, 
Nursing Institute 1, 
High School 13, 
Junior High School 2, 
Madrasa 10, 
Government Primary School 82, 
Non-Government Primary School 24;

Education Institute Name with Educational Institute Identification No (EIIN)-

Jahurul Islam Medical College
 Digher Par Junior Secondary School (EIIN – 110255)
 Bajitpur  Hafez Abdur  Razzak  Pilot  High  School (EIIN – 110245)
 Bajitpur  Razzakunnesa  Pilot  Girls  High  School (EIIN – 110244)
 Begum Rahima Girls High School (EIIN – 110240)
 Dilalpur Abdul Karim High School (EIIN – 110248)
 Duaigaon Sultanpur High School (EIIN – 110252)
 Halimpur High School (EIIN – 110250)
 Hilachia High School (EIIN – 110247)
 Kamar Ali Khan High School (EIIN – 110249)
 Meraj Mannan Alam High School (EIIN – 110254)
 Mofizur Rahman Rokan High School (EIIN – 110253)
 Nazirul Islam Collegiate School (EIIN – 110246)
 Pirijpur High School (EIIN – 110251)
 Sararcar  Sibnath Bahumukhi High School (EIIN – 110242)
 Sararchar  Soudamini Surbala Girls High School (EIIN – 110243)
 Abdul Mannan Shopon High School 2013(EIIN -) 
 Nilokhi Q.U. Junior Madrasha (EIIN – 110256)
 Pirizpur Islamia Dakhil Madrasa (EIIN – 110258)
 Sararchar Islamia Fazil Madrasha (EIIN – 110257)
 Bajitpur Degree College (EIIN – 110259)
Ad. Haji Usman Guni Model College
 Aftab Uddin School And College (EIIN – 110260)
 Sararchar Technical And Business Management College (EIIN – 132978)
 Jahurul Islam Nursing Training Institute (EIIN – 133131)
 Ismail Salma Agriculture Institute.
 Haji Abdul Bari Ninmo Maddhomik Biddhalay. (Burikanda, Sararchar)
Bajitpur Govt College(1964)

Notable people
There are many famous people of Bajitpur.

 Jahurul Islam (Industrialist)
 Md. Afzal Hossain (Politician)
 Sheikh Rahman (US Senetor)

References

 
Upazilas of Kishoreganj District